is a professional Japanese baseball player. He is a pitcher for the Yomiuri Giants of Nippon Professional Baseball (NPB).

References 

2001 births
Living people
Baseball people from Iwate Prefecture
Nippon Professional Baseball pitchers
Yomiuri Giants players